Santo Domingo, alternatively known as Santo Domingo del Táchira, is a city in Venezuela, located in Táchira.

Transportation
Santo Domingo is served by Mayor Buenaventura Vivas Airport, which is features limited domestic service on two airlines, Conviasa and Aerolineas Estelar. It is located 13.3km (22 minutes by car) away from the center of Santo Domingo.

References

Cities in Táchira